Confidence is an unincorporated community in Otego Township, Fayette County, Illinois, United States,  east-southeast of Vandalia.

References

Unincorporated communities in Fayette County, Illinois
Unincorporated communities in Illinois